Adagio is a 2000 Russian animated short film directed by Garri Bardin.

Plot 
The story of the tragedy, an innovator - the leader, the prophet, the consequences of joining the world of new ideas and about how distorted the followers of the search of eternal truths can be. Throughout the cartoon sounds the Adagio in G minor (commonly attributed to the composer Tomaso Albinoni).

Awards 

 2000, the - Grand Prix,  "Vyborg Account"
 2000 , the - Prize of the Russian-Evropeyskogoy Motion Picture Association at the VIII Russian film festival "Window to Europe"
 2000, the - Grand Prix at the International Human Rights Festival "Stalker"
 2000, the - Special Jury Prize International Film Festival in Marita
 2001, the - Gold Prize at the International Film Festival in New York
 2001, the - Prize of the Russian Academy Nika
 2001, the - Grand Prix International Film Festival in Rouen
 2001, the - Jury Prize International Film Festival in Tehran
 2001, the - Prize of the International Film Festival in Kaiare

References

External links
 
 

Russian animated short films
Russian musical fantasy films